Florence Priscilla, Lady Norman, CBE, JP (née McLaren; 1883 – 1 March 1964, Antibes) was a British activist and suffragist.

Background
Lady Norman was an active supporter of women's suffrage but not a militant. She held the post of Hon. Treasurer of the Liberal Women's Suffrage Union. Like her grandparents who started Bodnant Garden, Priscilla was a keen horticulturist. When she and her husband acquired Ramster Hall, Surrey she was instrumental in setting out rhododendrons and azaleas in the gardens. The gardens were opened to public view under the National Gardens Scheme from 1927 and continue to be opened under that scheme.

Politics
Like her mother, she was active in the cause of women's suffrage through the Liberal Women's Suffrage Union and the Women's Liberal Federation.

During the First World War, she ran a voluntary hospital in Wimereux, France with her husband. She was awarded the Mons Star for her services and created a CBE for her war services.

After the creation of the Imperial War Museum in 1917 she became chair of one of its subcommittees and was instrumental in ensuring that the contributions of women during the war were recorded and included in the museum's collections. Having an interest in mental health issues, she became the first woman to be appointed to the board of the Royal Earlswood Hospital in 1926. During the Second World War she was a driver for the Women's Voluntary Service in London.

The archives of Lady Norman are held at the Women's Library in London.

Family
Priscilla was the fourth child and second daughter of Charles McLaren, 1st Baron Aberconway and Laura Elizabeth Pochin. Her brothers were the Liberal politicians Henry D McLaren and Francis McLaren. In 1907 she married, as his second wife, Sir Henry Norman, 1st Baronet, a noted journalist and then Liberal MP for Wolverhampton South, who lost this seat in the first election of 1910 but then gained Blackburn in the second election of that year. Amongst the causes Sir Henry helped promote as a politician was women's suffrage.

References

Sources
 thePeerage.com

External links
 National Portrait Gallery
 Lives of the First World War 
 Imperial War Museums records 

1883 births
1964 deaths
Commanders of the Order of the British Empire
Daughters of barons
English suffragists
Liberal Party (UK) politicians
McLaren family
Priscilla
Wives of baronets
English justices of the peace